The 2018–19 Liga Națională season will be the 69th season of the Liga Națională, the highest professional basketball league in Romania. This will be the first season under a new format, which increases the number of teams to 22. CSM U Oradea are the defending champions.

Competition format
The Romanian Basketball Federation agreed a change in the competition format for the 2018–19 season:

 22 teams (divided into 3 value groups: A, B and C) played the regular season, consisting in a double-legged round robin format.
 Group A consist of the top 8 ranked teams from the 2017–18 Liga Națională.
 Group B consist of top 4 ranked teams from the 2017–18 Liga I.
 Group C consist of the other teams that played in the 2017–18 Liga Națională, 2017–18 Liga I or newly formed teams (which respect the financial and infrastructure criteria), but which not have the right to advance in this season to the final stages of the championship.
 At the end of the regular season, teams are split into four groups (Red, Yellow, Blue and Green).
 Red Group consist of the top 6 ranked teams from the Group A.
 Yellow Group consist of the bottom 2 ranked teams from the Group A, top 3 teams from the Group B and the winner of the Group C.
 Blue Group consist of the 4th place from the Group B and 2nd to 6th places from the Group C.
 Green Group consist of the 7th to 10th places from the Group C.
 All teams from the Red Group (from 1st to 6th place) and the top 2 ranked teams from the Yellow Group will join the play-offs. In this knockout stage, quarterfinals and semifinals will be played with a best-of-five-games format.
 To decide the teams ranked between 5th and 8th place will be used the best-of-three-games format.
 The rest of the teams from the Yellow, Blue and Green Groups (16 teams) will form 2 groups of 8 teams and will play to decide the final rankings.
 Last six teams of play out phase  (17th-22nd place) will be relegated to Liga I

Team changes 
Promoted from Liga I

 Cuza Sport Brăila
 Aurel Vlaicu București
 Athletic Constanța
 CSO Voluntari
 CSM BC Sighetu Marmației
 CSM Mediaș
 Rapid București
 ACS Târgu Jiu
 Agronomia București
 Universitatea Cluj-Napoca

Excluded teams 
 BC Mureș was dissolved.

Other teams 
 Miercurea Ciuc, CSM Focșani and CSM Târgu Mureș were enrolled in the Liga Națională.

Teams

Group A

Group B

Group C

Regular season

Group A

League table

Results

Group B

League table

Results

Group C

League table

Results

Second stage

Red Group

League table

Results

Yellow Group

League table

Results

Blue Group

League table

Results

Green Group

League table

Results

Play-offs
All series were played in a best-of-five games format, except the third place match which was played in best-of-three games format.

Bracket

5th to 8th
All series were played in a best-of-three games format.

9th to 16th position
All series were played by two-legged series.

Bracket

13th to 16th
All series were played in a best-of-three games format.

17th to 21st position

Final rankings

Romanian clubs in European competitions

References

External links
Official site of the Romanian Basketball Federation
Halfcourt.info (Romanian and English)
Numaibaschet.ro (Romanian)
Baschetromania.ro (Romanian)

2018-19
Romanian
Lea